Wiang Nuea may refer to:

Wiang Nuea, Mueang Lampang
Wiang Nuea, Pai
 Wiang Nuea, Wiang Chai

See also
Wiang (disambiguation)